The Hospital General de Agudos Bernardino Rivadavia was founded in 1774 in 800 Bartolomé Mitre St., San Nicolás, Buenos Aires, Argentina, with the name Hospital de mujeres (Women's Hospital).

In 1887 it was moved to its present location in 2670 Las Heras Ave., in the Palermo neighbourhood.

Notes

Hospital buildings completed in 1887
Hospitals in Buenos Aires
1774 establishments in South America
Agudos Bernardino